Mikorzyn  is a village in the administrative district of Gmina Ślesin, within Konin County, Greater Poland Voivodeship, in west-central Poland.

The village has an approximate population of 550.

References

Mikorzyn